The Rehearsal Club was a London club providing support to actresses, ballet dancers and music hall chorus girls. The club provided a space to rest, read, eat and socialize between morning and evening performances. It was founded in 1892 by the Rev. John Fenwick Kitto, vicar of St Martin-in-the-Fields, with the support of Prince Christian, who became the club's President. It seems to have been based at different times at 29 Leicester Square and at Cranbourne Street.

References

Organizations established in 1892
Women's organisations based in England
Cultural organisations based in London
Theatrical organisations in the United Kingdom
Theatre in London
1892 establishments in England
Arts organizations established in the 1890s
Women in London